Budgee is a rural locality in the Toowoomba Region, Queensland, Australia. In the  Budgee had a population of 35 people.

History 
Budgee State School opened on 11 November 1913. In 1916 it became a half-time school with Hirstvale Provisional School (meaning they shared a single teacher). When the Hirstvale school closed in 1917, Budgee returned to full-time school status.  In 1917 Hirstvale School closed and Budgee once again became a full time school. The school closed on 23 February 1941, and reopened on 29 January 1952. It closed permanently on 24 January 1965.

In the  Budgee had a population of 35 people.

References 

Toowoomba Region
Localities in Queensland